A leadership election for the Freedom Union (US)  was held in the Czech Republic on 28 February 2000. Karel Kühnl was elected the new leader of the Freedom Union.

Background
The election was held following the resignation of the previous leader, Jan Ruml. Karel Kühnl then became the acting leader. The new election was scheduled for 28 February 2000. Kühnl ran for the leadership, and Vladimír Mlynář was his only rival. Kühnl was considered the front-runner.

Voting

References

2000
Freedom Union leadership election
Indirect elections
Freedom Union leadership election
Freedom Union leadership election